Majhi is an Indo-Aryan language spoken in parts of Nepal and formerly in some small pockets of neighboring India.:1 The language is associated with the Majhi people, an ethnic group in those regions who dwell historically near the Saptakoshi River and its tributaries and elsewhere in central and eastern Nepal. The Majhi people generally subsist off of work associated with rivers, including fishing and ferrying.:2 Majhi is written using the Devanagari writing system.

Ethnologue classifies Mahji as a 6b threatened language. There are roughly 24,400 L1 speakers of Majhi in Nepal and roughly 46,120 L1 and L2 speakers of the language around the globe. Most of the Majhi speakers in Nepal are bilingual with the more predominant Nepali language,:2 and the latter language is replacing Majhi in use. Majhi's lack of official status, use in education, in media, in print, etc. places the survival of the language in a precarious position.:2

The last speaker in India, Thak Bahadur Majhi of Jorethang in Sikkim state, died in 2016.

Phonology

Vowels 
Majhi has a total of 13 vowels, five of which are diphthongs.:6, 8

N.B. Diphthongs in Majhi include: eu, əu, au, əi, oi.:8 The vowels /ɜː, acː/ do not occur anywhere except in the word-final position while other vowels can appear in any position in a word.:7

Consonants 
Majhi has a total of 29 consonants.:9

Syllable structure 
Majhi allows consonant clusters to form in the onset but not the coda. However, researchers believe that further study on syllable structure is necessary to ascertain a fuller understanding of the syllable structure.:17 When Majhi features two consonants in the onset, the second consonant will be a glide (/j, w/).:13 Some examples of the syllable structure are included in the chart below.

Morphology

Affixation

Derivational affixation 
Majhi uses affixation to derive words through nominalization, verbalization, and negation. For nominalizers and verbalizers, Majhi uses suffixation. For negation, Majhi uses prefixation. Examples are included in the chart below.

Inflectional affixation 
Majhi uses morphemes to inflect words (specifically, to decline nouns and to conjugate verbs). Nouns are declined for case, number, and gender. Nouns are also declined for pronominal possessive suffixes, which indicate the possessor of the noun (see example below).:43 Verbs are conjugated for person, number, tense, aspect, and mood.:89

Other morphological processes

Compounding 
Majhi can form new words by combining two roots. In the example below, combining the words for grandfather and grandmother yields the plural grandparents.:22

Reduplication 
Majhi sometimes completely reduplicates a full noun, verb, adjective, or adverb form in order to add extra emphasis. For nouns, Majhi also adds a suffix "-e" to the first instance of the noun. For example, the noun "kapal" means 'head,' and, when it is reduplicated with the suffix as "kapal-e kapal," the combined phrase means 'all heads.':20 Verbs do not have such a suffix. For example, the verb "bəl-ni" means 'I said,' but, when reduplicated "bəl-ni bəl-ni," the combined reduplication would mean 'I said it (which I will definitely not change).':89 Adjectives can be reduplicated for emphasis in the same manner. For example, the adjective "lamo" means "long," and, when it is reduplicated as "lamo lmao," it means very long.:54 Adverbs can be reduplicated in the same manner as adjectives. For example, the adverb "tshiṭo" means 'quickly,' and, when it is reduplicated as "tshiṭo tshiṭo," it means 'very quickly.':96

Particles 
Mahji features several particles that perform various functions, including indicating questions, emphasis, and hearsay.:73, 97 Mahji also shares some particles with Nepali.:97 Examples of some Mahji particles are given below.

Question particle te 
The particle te comes at the end of a sentence and indicates a question.:97

Contrastive, emphatic particle ta 
Mahji uses the particle ta in order to provide an emphatic contrast.:97

Hearsay particle ni 
Mahji uses the hearsay particle ni to indicate an uncertain secondhand knowledge.:73

Syntax

Standard word order 
The basic word order of Majhi is SOV.:111 This word order is fairly consistent across the language. Mahji is an in situ language for wh-questions and yes-no questions, meaning that it maintains its standard word order for questions.:118 The three examples below illustrate this word order:

 Declarative sentence:85

 Wh-question:119

 Yes-no question:120

Noun phrases and adpositional phrases

Possessee + possessor 
With the possessee + possessor relationship (genitive modifiers), the possessor precedes the possessee.:105

Adposition + noun phrase 
Majhi uses adpositions as analytical rather than synthetic markers.:28 In the example below, the noun phrase also appears with a specific case (the genitive case) with this postposition.:29

Adverb placement 
In Mahji, the adverb generally precedes the verb. For example, see below.:96

Notes

References 

Eastern Indo-Aryan languages
Bihari languages